The 2si 690 is a family of in-line three cylinder, liquid-cooled, two-stroke, dual ignition, aircraft engines that were designed for ultralight aircraft.

The basic engine was originally designed and produced by JLO-Motorenwerke of Germany and was later acquired by the AMW Cuyuna Engine Company of Beaufort, South Carolina and marketed under the Cuyuna brand name. Later the engine was marketed by Cuyuna under the Two Stroke International (2si) brand. Cuyuna no longer markets engines for aircraft use although the 690 is still in production as an industrial and marine engine.

Development
The 690 is a conventional three-cylinder engine that weighs  in its L70 aircraft and marine versions. The aircraft engine features dual capacitor discharge ignition (single in the marine and industrial versions), reed valve porting, tuned exhaust system, three slide venturi-type carburetors, liquid cooling, fuel pumps, a cast iron cylinder liner, ball, needle and roller bearings throughout. The aircraft version was offered with an optional gearbox reduction dive system and a centrifugal clutch. The current industrial and marine version has an available gearbox with ratios of 2.04, 2.65 or 3.06:1. Starting is electric start only.

Variants
690-L70 aircraft engine
Gasoline aircraft engine with triple carburetors,  at 6250 rpm, weight , out of production.
690L-70 industrial and marine engine
Gasoline industrial and marine engine, triple carburetors,  at 6250 rpm, weight , electric starter mounted on the accessory cover end. Still in production.
690AL-70 industrial and marine engine
Gasoline industrial and marine engine, triple carburetors,  at 6250 rpm, weight , electric starter mounted on the power take-off end. Still in production.

Applications
Aircraft
RagWing RW11 Rag-A-Bond
RagWing RW19 Stork
RagWing RW22 Tiger Moth
Sky Science PowerHawk
St Andrews Viking
Viking Aircraft Viking II

Specifications (690-L70 aircraft engine)

See also

References

Two-stroke aircraft piston engines
Straight-three engines